Benjamin Franklin Hunt (November 10, 1888 – September 27, 1927) was a starting pitcher in Major League Baseball who played for the Boston Red Sox and St. Louis Cardinals. He was born in Eufaula, Oklahoma.

In a two-season career, Hunt posted a 2–4 record with 25 strikeouts and a 3.95 earned run average in nine appearances, including eight starts, three complete games, and 54⅔ innings of work.

Hunt died in Greybull, Wyoming at age 38.

External links

Retrosheet

1888 births
1927 deaths
Boston Red Sox players
St. Louis Cardinals players
Major League Baseball pitchers
Baseball players from Oklahoma
Hutchinson Salt Packers players
Sacramento Sacts players
Tacoma Tigers players
Chattanooga Lookouts players
Vancouver Beavers players
Wichita Witches players
Colorado Springs Millionaires players
Tulsa Producers players
Butte Miners players
Dallas Submarines players